Michiko Evwana (born December 8, 1974), better known by her stage name , is a Japanese hip-hop and reggae musician, as well as a singer-songwriter and record producer. She is the first soca artist from Japan.

She began playing reggae music in Japanese clubs in 1996. Her 2002 debut single, "The Perfect Vision", went on to sell over 500,000 copies.

Biography 
Michiko Evwana was born in Osaka Prefecture, Japan, on December 8, 1974.  She began playing the piano at the age of five, at which time she began to take interest in soul and jazz music. Minmi began her musical career in 1996, performing at rub-a-dub showcases and hip hop events in the clubs of Osaka. She also began to develop her own sound by making her own original tracks around this period. Minmi signed her first recording deal with JVC Records, releasing the reggae song "The Perfect Vision" as her first single in August 2002. Minmi's first single became extremely popular, and was widely accepted and heavily rotated by as many as 20 FM radio stations. "The Perfect Vision," after gradually increasing in popularity, would eventually sell over 500,000 copies. Her second single, "T.T.T.," differed stylistically, more influenced by hip-hop. The single was a moderate success, peaking in the top 10. These were followed by Minmi's debut album Miracle, which debuted at No. 2 and has sold more than 600,000 copies. Minmi continued her success in 2004, with her second album Imagine, which was also a high seller.

In 2004, she contributed the song "" ("Shiki no Uta") to the anime Samurai Champloo, where it appears as the end credits theme.

In 2005, Minmi released her first soca-influenced song, "Summertime!!," as opposed to her regular reggae and hip-hop sound. Because of this event, she attended the Trinidad and Tobago Carnival in February 2006, performing on stage. In September, she was nominated for best new artist at the Reggae/Soca Music Awards in New York. Minmi attended the festival again in 2007, performing "Sha Na Na (Japanese Wine)" with Machel Montano.

In June 2007, it was suddenly announced that Minmi had married Wakadanna, a member of reggae group Shōnan no Kaze, and was four months pregnant. The two had first met in 2001 in Jamaica, and began dating soon after. In November she gave birth to her first child, a son.

In March 2010 it was announced that Minmi was pregnant with her second child. Her fourth album Mother, released in July when she was roughly eight months pregnant, prominently features her stomach in the photographs. The child, the second boy, was born ten days early on August 4 in New York.

On June 10 and July 22, 2015, Minmi released her seventeenth single "Hologram".

Bibliography

Discography

Albums

Other albums

Singles

As lead artist

As featured artist

Digital Singles

DVDs

Collaborations

References

External links 
  
 Minmi at Oricon 
Agency profiles:
 Minmi at Victor Entertainment 
 Minmi at Universal Music Group Japan 

1974 births
Living people
Japanese reggae musicians
Japanese women pop singers
Japanese women singer-songwriters
Musicians from Osaka Prefecture
21st-century Japanese singers
21st-century Japanese women singers
Women hip hop musicians
Japanese hip hop singers